Henry D. Humphrey was treasurer of Norfolk County, Massachusetts beginning in 1907 and serving at least until 1918.  He had previously served in the Massachusetts House of Representatives.

References

County treasurers of Norfolk County, Massachusetts
Year of birth missing
Year of death missing
Members of the Massachusetts House of Representatives